Gonutsoga, also Gonitsoga, is a village in North-West District of Botswana. It is located close to the western border against Namibia. The population was 506 in 2001 census.

References

North-West District (Botswana)
Villages in Botswana